A Sense of Purpose Tour was a concert tour by Swedish metal band In Flames in support of their ninth studio album, A Sense of Purpose, which was released in April 2008.

The tour began in May 2008 with a slot on Gigantour in North American markets, which was headlined by Megadeth. Following runs through Europe and a second North American leg, the tour continued through 2009 with the band's first visit to South America, as well as dates in Australia and Japan.

In February 2009, it was confirmed that lead guitarist Jesper Strömblad would be taking leave from future touring, due to his focus on alcohol rehabilitation. He was replaced with former member Niklas Engelin. Later in the month, an upcoming spring tour of the U.K. and Ireland was cancelled after it was announced that a second member, bassist Peter Iwers, would be taking leave due to the anticipated birth of his child. The band, minus Strömblad, fulfilled all touring commitments up to early April and resumed performing in the summer.

In September 2009, the band commenced a Canadian co-headlining trek with Killswitch Engage. Following the dates in Canada, the group toured the United States through early October.

In November 2009, the group teamed up once again with Killswitch Engage for the European leg of the "Taste of Chaos" tour. In January 2010, the band played their final leg of the tour, performing four dates in Asia.

Tour dates

 1^ Headline show; non-Gigantour appearance.
 2^ Date supporting Lamb of God.
 3^ Date featuring co-headliners Lamb of God.
 4^ Date featuring co-headliners Killswitch Engage (Killswitch Engage played last in Mississauga, Thunder Bay, Winnipeg and Edmonton).
 5^ Date part of the "Taste of Chaos" tour featuring co-headliners Killswitch Engage (Killswitch Engage played last on all U.K. dates).

Cancelled dates

Support acts 

 3 Inches of Blood (18 September – 6 October 2009)
 36 Crazyfists (6 November – 10 December 2008)
 All That Remains (6 November – 10 December 2008)
 Between the Buried and Me (8 September – 6 October 2009)
 Dead by April (11–16 December 2009)
 Every Time I Die (27 November – 16 December 2009)
 The Faceless (18 September – 6 October 2009)
 Gojira (27 September – 2 November 2008; 6 November – 10 December 2008)

 Heaven Shall Burn (6–9 December 2009)
 Maylene and the Sons of Disaster (27 November – 16 December 2009)
 Inexist (5–8 November 2009)
 Protest the Hero (8–17 September 2009)
 Sonic Syndicate (27 September – 2 November 2008)
 Sybreed (16–24 November 2009)
 Unearth (4–6 March 2009)

References

External links
 

2008 concert tours
2009 concert tours
2010 concert tours
In Flames concert tours
Concerts at Malmö Arena